John Samuel Benham (October 24, 1863 – December 11, 1935) was an American educator and politician who served two terms as a U.S. Representative from Indiana from 1919 to 1923.

Biography 
Born on a farm near Benham, Indiana, Benham attended public schools, a business college in Delaware, Ohio, and a normal school in Brookville, Indiana.
He taught school in the winter and attended college in the summer, being engaged as a teacher in various places in Indiana from 1882 to 1907.
He graduated from Indiana State University in Terre Haute, Indiana, in 1893 and from Indiana University at Bloomington, Indiana, in 1903. He specialized in history at the University of Chicago for several terms. He became the superintendent of schools for Ripley County for fourteen years. He returned to Benham, Indiana, in 1907 and engaged in the timber, milling, contracting business, and followed agricultural pursuits. He served as a delegate to the Republican National Convention in 1916.

Congress 
Benham was elected as a Republican to the Sixty-sixth and Sixty-seventh Congresses (March 4, 1919-March 3, 1923).
He served as chairman of the Committee on Expenditures on Public Buildings (Sixty-seventh Congress).
He was an unsuccessful candidate for reelection in 1922 to the Sixty-eighth Congress.

Later career and death 
He moved to Batesville, Indiana, in 1923 and engaged as a building contractor. He was again the superintendent of schools for Ripley County, Indiana from 1924 to 1929.
He retired from active business pursuits in 1931 and resided in Batesville, Indiana, until his death there on December 11, 1935.
He was interred in Benham Church Cemetery, near Benham, Indiana.

References

1863 births
1935 deaths
People from Franklin County, Indiana
Indiana State University alumni
Politicians from Terre Haute, Indiana
Republican Party members of the United States House of Representatives from Indiana